Gianni Frankis (born 16 April 1988) is a British-born Italian athlete specialising in the sprint hurdles. He represented Great Britain at the 2009 World Championships without advancing from the first round. In addition, he won several medals at age-group competitions. He switched allegiance from Great Britain to Italy in 2016 but is yet to compete internationally for the new country.

His personal bests are 13.54 seconds in the 110 metres hurdles (+2.0 m/s, Newham 2013) and 7.67 seconds in the 60 metres hurdles (Vienna 2013).

International competitions

References

1988 births
Living people
English male hurdlers
World Athletics Championships athletes for Great Britain
People from Rochford
English people of Italian descent
Italian people of English descent